Santosh Anand (born 5 March 1929) is an Indian lyricist who attained success in the 1970s, earning the Filmfare Award for Best Lyricist twice in 1975 and 1983. He has also been awarded the Yash Bharti Award in 2016. He studied library science at Aligarh Muslim University

Career
Santosh Anand was born in the town of Sikandrabad District Bulandshahr (30 km from Ghaziabad on G T Road towards Buland shahar). He began his career in 1970 with the film Purab Aur Paschim. This film's soundtrack was composed by Kalyanji-Anandji. He wrote his favorite song "Ek Pyar Ka Naghma Hai" in 1972 film Shor. It was composed by Laxmikant-Pyarelal and sung by Mukesh and Lata Mangeshkar. He provided lyrics for the 1974 film Roti Kapda Aur Makaan, also composed by Laxmikant-Pyarelal. Its song included "Aur Nahin Bas Aur Nahin," sung by Mahendra Kapoor, and the duet "Main Na Bhoolunga," sung by Mukesh and Lata Mangeshkar. Santosh obtained his first Filmfare Award for Best Lyricist for that film.

He penned the songs for the film Kranti (1981), the highest-grossing Hindi film of that year. The same year, he penned songs such as "Tera Saath Hai To" and "Megha Re Megha Re" in the film Pyaasa Sawan. In 1982, he penned the song "Mohabbat Hai Kya Cheez" under Laxmikant-Pyarelal in the film Prem Rog. He was awarded his second and last Filmfare Award for Best Lyricist for this song.
He has penned a total of 109 songs in 26 films.

Collaborations
Santosh Anand started his career in the 1970 film Purab Aur Paschim under Kalyanji-Anandji. His soundtracks such as Shor, Roti Kapda Aur Makan, Kranti, Pyaasa Sawan and Prem Rog all had music by Laxmikant-Pyarelal. His only collaboration with music directors is limited to L-P.

His songs "Ek Pyar Ka Naghma Hai", "Main Na Bhoolunga", "Yeh Galiyan Yeh Chaubara", "Tera Saath Hai To", "Megha Re Megha Re" were all sung by the singer Lata Mangeshkar. Anuradha Paudwal also sung for him in movies like Junoon (1992) and Tahalka (1992). Among male singers, Mukesh, Mahendra Kapoor and Mohammed Aziz sang songs penned by him.

Selected discography
Purab Aur Pachhim (1970)
Shor (1972)
Roti Kapada Aur Makaan (1974)
Patthar Se Takkar (1980)
Kranti (1981)
Pyaasa Sawan (1981)
Prem Rog (1982)
Mera Jawab (1985)
Patthar Dil (1985)
Love 86 (1986)
Mazloom (1986)
Bade Ghar Ki Beti (1989)
Naag Nagin (1989)
Santosh (1989)
Suryaa: An Awakening (1989)
Do Matwale (1991)
Naag Mani (1991)
Ranbhoomi (1991)
Junoon (1992)
Sangeet (1992)Tahalka (1992)Tirangaa (1993)Sangam Ho Ke Rahega (1994)Prem Aggan'' (1998)

Awards

References

External links
Santosh Anand Songs 

Santosh Anand Pic and Introduction 

Santosh Anand Poems and Songs 

Hindi-language lyricists
Indian lyricists
Indian male songwriters
Living people
People from Bulandshahr district
1929 births